The 1998 International Raiffeisen Grand Prix was a men's tennis tournament played on Clay in St. Pölten, Austria that was part of the International Series of the 1998 ATP Tour. It was the eighteenth edition of the tournament and was held from 18 May until 24 May 1998. First-seeded Marcelo Ríos won the singles title.

Finals

Singles

 Marcelo Ríos defeated  Vincent Spadea, 6–2, 6–0.

Doubles

 Jim Grabb /  David Macpherson defeated  David Adams /  Wayne Black, 6–4, 6–4.

References

International Raiffeisen Grand Prix
Hypo Group Tennis International
Hypo